BearTracks Recording Studio was a recording studio complex in Suffern, New York, owned by Jay Beckenstein of Spyro Gyra and built in the early 1980s. Operating from 1982 at 926 Haverstraw Road in Suffern, the studio is no longer in business. It was announced that BearTracks would cease operation shortly after Spyro Gyra recorded their 2006 album Wrapped in a Dream.

A dark and faint photograph of the building that holds the studio can be seen on the tray card of Dream Theater's album, Metropolis Pt. 2: Scenes from a Memory. The surrounding property was also the location for some of the band's videos associated with the album.

Clients 

 Spyro Gyra
 Goo Goo Dolls
 Dream Theater
 Seth Regan
 Jonatha Brooke
 Gabriela Anders
 FireHouse
 Leon Parker
 Phil Ramone
 Nile Rodgers
 Michael Barbiero
 Barry Eastmond
 Andy Johns
 Elliot Scheiner
 George Benson
 Chris Botti
 Julian Lennon
 Mariah Carey
 Wolfgang Haffner
 Jason Miles
 Bob James
 Jennifer Kimball
 Bruce Hornsby
 Mark S. Berry
 David Wilcox
 Cassandra Wilson
 Patty Larkin
 Adam Cohen
 Joe Ferla
 Foreigner
 Gigolo Aunts
 Kirk Whalum
 Hot Tuna
 Chuck Loeb
 David Clayton Thomas
 The Story
 Renee Rosnes
 Yanni
 David Broza
 Jonathan Butler
 Harlem Boys Choir
 Charlie Hunter
 The Band
 Stretch Princess
 John Alagia
 Gary Moore
 Imaginary Road
 Dry Kill Logic
 10,000 Maniacs
 Rosanne Cash
 Primer 55
 Days of the New
 Immature
 Richard Stoltzman
 Judy Collins
 Thrice
 S.A. Sanctuary
 Anthrax
 H2O
 Strangefolk
 The Wayouts

References

External links
Official site (archived)

Recording studios in New York (state)